Octomeria lithophila is a species of orchid endemic to southeastern Brazil.

References

External links 

lithophila
Endemic orchids of Brazil